Association football clubs from the French Overseas Collectivity of Saint Pierre and Miquelon have represented the archipelago in the Coupe de France beginning with the 2018–19 edition of the tournament. The following is a list of year-by-year results of Saint Pierre and Miquelon's representative.

Results

2018–2019

A.S. Saint Pierraise advanced to the third round of the 2018–19 Coupe de France. The team was eventually eliminated by a narrow 1–2 defeat to ALC Longvic of the Ligue Bourgogne-Franche-Comté dE Football (VII). Maël Kello made history as the first Saint Pierre and Miquelon player to score in the tournament.

2019–2020

For the 2019–20 season, A.S. Ilienne Amateur became the second team from Saint Pierre and Miquelon to compete in Metropolitan France in the Coupe de France after teams from the island entered the tournament for the first time in 2018–19. Prior to its Third Round match against FC Lyon, A.S.I.A toured the Groupama Stadium home of Ligue 1 side Olympique Lyonnais. The match ended in a 1–5 defeat, ending the club's campaign for the year.

2020–2021

As the winner of the preliminary rounds on Saint Pierre and Miquelon, A.S. Saint Pierraise would have gained entry to the third round draw of the Pays de la Loire region. However, on 8 September 2020, the overseas territory banned travel to mainland France due to the ongoing COVID-19 situation. The side had been due to depart on 12 September, travelling via Montreal and Paris. The club was scheduled to take on La Roche VF eight days later.

2021–2022 

In May 2021 it was announced that A.S. Saint Pierraise would not receive an automatic qualification to the third round of the 2021–22 Coupe de France despite losing the opportunity the previous year because of the COVID-19 pandemic. The first and second round local qualification matches were played between 7 July and 24 July 2021 with the winner participating in the Pays de la Loire region third round in September 2021. A.S. Miquelonnaise received a bye to the second round match as the reigning champions of the Ligue SPM from the 2020 season. A.S. Saint Pierraise took on USSA Vertou in France, ultimately losing the match 0–8.

References

External links
FFF records
Summary 2018-2020